The 1974 Jackson State Tigers football team represented the Jackson State University as a member of the Southwestern Athletic Conference (SWAC) during the 1974 NCAA Division II football season. Led by fourth-year head coach Robert Hill, The Tigers compiled an overall record of 7–3 with a conference mark of 4–2, placing third in the SWAC. Jackson State played their home games at Mississippi Veterans Memorial Stadium in Jackson, Mississippi.

Schedule

Roster

Game summaries

at Grambling State

1975 NFL Draft

References

Jackson State
Jackson State Tigers football seasons
Jackson State Tigers football